Miqan (also Romanized as Mīqān; also known as Meyghān and Mīghān) is a village in Kharqan Rural District, Bastam District, Shahrud County, Semnan Province, Iran. At the 2006 census, its population was 2,207, in 587 families.

References 

Populated places in Shahrud County